Software audio synthesis environments typically consist of an audio programming language (which may be graphical) and a user environment to design/run the language in. Although many of these environments are comparable in their abilities to produce high-quality audio, their differences and specialties are what draw users to a particular platform. This article compares noteworthy audio synthesis environments, and enumerates basic issues associated with their use.

Subjective comparisons
Audio synthesis environments comprise a wide and varying range of software and hardware configurations. Even different versions of the same environment can differ dramatically. Because of this broad variability, certain aspects of different systems cannot be directly compared. Moreover, some levels of comparison are either very difficult to objectively quantify, or depend purely on personal preference.

Some of the commonly considered subjective attributes for comparison include:
 Usability (how difficult is it for beginners to generate some kind of meaningful output)
 Learnability (how steep the learning curve is for new, average, and advancing users)
 Sound "quality" (which environment produces the most subjectively appealing sound)
 Creative flow (in what ways does the environment affect the creative process - e.g. guiding the user in certain directions)

These attributes can vary strongly depending on the tasks used for evaluation.

Some other common comparisons include:
 Audio performance (issues such as throughput, latency, concurrency, etc.)
 System performance (issues such as buggyness or stability)
 Support and community (who uses the system and who provides help, advice, training and tutorials)
 System capabilities (what is possible and what is not possible [regardless of effort] with the system)
 Interoperability (how well does the system integrate with other systems from different vendors)

Building blocks of sound and sound "quality" 
Audio software often has a slightly different "sound" when compared against others. This is because there are different ways to implement the basic building blocks (such as sinewaves, pink noise, or FFT) which result in slightly different aural characteristics. Although people can of course prefer one system's "sound" over another, perhaps the best output can be determined by using sophisticated audio analyzers in combination with the listener's ears. The idea of this would be to arrive at what most would agree is as "pure" a sound as possible.

User interface 
The interface to an audio system often has a significant influence on the creative flow of the user, not because of what is possible (the stable/mature systems listed here are fully featured enough to be able to achieve an enormous range of sonic/compositional objectives), but because of what is made easy and what is made difficult. This is again very difficult to boil down to a brief comparative statement. One issue may be which interface metaphors are used (e.g. boxes-and-wires, documents, flow graphs, hardware mixing desks).

General

Programming language features

Data interface methods
Interfaces between the language environment and other software or hardware (not user interfaces).

Technical

References

See also
 List of music software

Audio programming languages
Electronic music software
 
Multimedia software comparisons
Software synthesizers